The 2013 Mr. Olympia contest 
was an IFBB professional bodybuilding competition  held September 27–28, 2013, at the Orleans Arena at The Orleans Hotel and Casino in Paradise, Nevada. It was the 49th Mr. Olympia competition held. Other events at the exhibition included the 212 Olympia Showdown, Ms. Olympia, Fitness Olympia, Figure Olympia, Bikini Olympia, Women's Physique Showdown, and Men's Physique Showdown contests.

Results
A total prize pool of $675,000 was awarded.

See also
 2013 Ms. Olympia

References

External links 
 Mr. Olympia homepage

 2013
Mr Olympia
2013 in bodybuilding